Decinea decinea is a species of butterfly of the family Hesperiidae. It is found from South America (Brazil, Venezuela).

Subspecies
Decinea decinea decinea (Brazil: Rio de Janeiro, Paraná)
Decinea decinea derisor (Venezuela)

External links
Butterflies and Moths of North America

Hesperiini
Hesperiidae of South America
Butterflies of North America
Butterflies described in 1876
Taxa named by William Chapman Hewitson